Bni Bouayach (Tarifit: Bni Buɛyac, ⴱⵏⵉ ⴱⵓⵄⵢⴰⵛ; Arabic: بني بوعياش) is a city in Al Hoceïma Province located in the region of Tanger-Tetouan-Al Hoceima, Morocco. Bni Bouayach is the 3rd largest city in Al Hoceima province. The inhabitants are of Berber or Amazigh origin. According to the 2014 census it has a population of 18,271.

Toponymy
Bni Buɛyac (in Arabic) or Ayt Buɛyac (in Riffian Berber) means "sons of Buɛyac".

Geography 
Bni Bouayach is located in the region of Tanger-Tetouan-Al Hoceima in Al Hoceima Province. Bni bouayach borders the city Imzouren to the north and Rural Commune Nekkour with Tifarouine to the South. To the east it borders the Rual Commune of Louta. The city is coneccted through the highway M2.

Education
There is offered some basic education in the city that consists of Primary, Secondary and High School. The city also offers a technical school or technical college with diploma in the fields of masonry, electricity and carpentry.

Healthcare
The city of Bni Bouayach is served by a public and some private clinics.

Popular sites
Azrou Zhi'tha is the name of the tallest mountain in this town and is a popular site for mountain hikes.

Transport
Bni Bouayach is served by taxi within the city and also connected with other cities.

Sport
The city offers sport facilities.

References

Populated places in Al Hoceïma Province
Municipalities of Morocco